Ernest Ludwig Klein (1910–1990) was an Austrian-British chess master and author.

Born in Vienna into a Jewish family, he emigrated to the United Kingdom in 1930s. He tied for 3rd-4th at Győr 1930 (Isaac Kashdan won), lost a match to Savielly Tartakower (1 : 3) at Paris 1935, tied for 4-5th at Margate 1935 (Samuel Reshevsky), and was unofficial Alexander Alekhine's second in his World Championship match against Max Euwe in 1935.

He tied for 5-6th at Hastings 1938/39 (László Szabó won), shared 2nd with Salo Flohr, behind Euwe, at Bournemouth 1939.

After World War II, he tied for 9-10th at Birmingham 1951 (Staunton Memorial, won by Petar Trifunović and Vasja Pirc), and won the British Championship in 1951.

References

External links

“Ernst Ludwig Klein” by Edward Winter

1910 births
1990 deaths
Jewish Austrian sportspeople
Austrian emigrants to the United Kingdom
British people of Austrian-Jewish descent
Jewish British sportspeople
Austrian chess players
British chess players
Jewish chess players
20th-century chess players